GFirst LEP is a Local enterprise partnership – one of 38 in England – and is responsible for Gloucestershire's Strategic Economic Plan.

A partnership of business and local government, LEPs were created in 2011. GFirst claims that it was responsible for bringing £77m of inward investment to Gloucestershire in 2015 alone.  The LEP chair says in the 2015 annual report that GFirst is "the most successful LEP in the country; the only LEP to receive everything it asked for – and more – from Government." In addition to various local authorities, the 2015 annual report lists the University of Gloucestershire and the "Royal Agricultural College" (correct name Royal Agricultural University) as partners. The chair of the LEP is Diane Savory.

See also 
 Gloucester
 Cheltenham
 Stroud
 Cirencester

References

External links 

Local enterprise partnerships
Economy of Gloucestershire